The 1986 Texas Longhorns football team represented the University of Texas at Austin in the 1986 NCAA Division I-A football season. The Longhorns finished the regular season with a 5–6 record, their first losing season since 1956. Following their 16–3 loss to rival Texas A&M, athletic director DeLoss Dodds dismissed head coach Fred Akers.

Schedule

Personnel

Season summary

Texas A&M

References

Texas
Texas Longhorns football seasons
Texas Longhorns football